Vinod Prakash Sharma (6 April 1938 – 9 October 2015) was an Indian malariologist and entomologist, known for his work in vector biology and bioenvironmental control of malaria. Recipient of many awards, including the Padma Shri, he was again honoured by the Government of India, in 2014, by bestowing on him the third highest civilian award, the Padma Bhushan.

Biography

Vinod Prakash Sharma was born on 6 April 1938 in Allahabad, in Uttar Pradesh, India. After early education locally, he joined Allahabad University from where he secured MSc in 1960 and DPhil in 1964. In 1965, he left to South Bend, Indiana, USA and joined the University of Notre Dame as a post doctoral research associate, but later, shifted to Purdue University, USA. Sharma returned to India in 1968 and joined Allahabad University, again, to complete his DSc which he promptly did in 1979.

Sharma, lived in Vasant Kunj, New Delhi and took care of his duties as the Distinguished Professor at the Centre for Rural Development and Technology, Indian Institute of Technology Delhi.

Career

Sharma started his career at the Forest Research Institute, in the high altitude area of Dehradun, as a Pool Officer, in 1969. A year later, he joined the World Health Organization sponsored Indian Council of Medical Research project as a Senior Scientist on genetic control of Culicine mosquitoes, in 1970, where he worked till 1975. The next move was to the Vector Control Research Centre and Malaria Research Unit, in 1976, as the deputy director, for a 2-year stint there. In 1978, he joined the Malaria Research Centre, New Delhi as its deputy director.

During his stint at the Malaria Research Centre, he started working on the upgradation of the centre and, as a result, the centre was upgraded by the Government of India, renaming it as the National Institute of Malaria Research, in 1982. Sharma was made its first Director, a post from where he retired, in 1998, as Additional Director-General of Indian Council of Medical Research.

On his retirement from the government service, the Indian Council of Medical Research recognised Sharma's services by making him the Meghnad Saha Distinguished Fellow of the National Academy of Sciences (India) at the Centre for Rural Development and Technology, IIT Delhi.

He is also leading the Safe Water campaign initiated by National Academy of Sciences, India

Major achievements

Sharma has been credited with many scientific and research achievements. His studies on the chemo and radio sterilisation of male mosquitoes are well documented. He is credited with developing a new technique for sex separation of mosquitoes. He has also worked extensively on the bioenvironmental malaria control which led to many innovations in the subject. He is also acknowledged for his contributions to vector biology.

Sharma is known to have developed the Malaria Research Unit, New Delhi into a full-fledged Research Centre, the National Institute of Malaria Research (NIMR). He has also contributed to the popularisation of science, through his books, journals and education programs.

Positions held
Vinod Prakash Sharma has held many positions of importance, by way of recognition and those of responsibility, throughout his career.
 Fellow of Royal Asiatic Society
 Fellow of the National Academy of Medical Sciences,
 Fellow of National Academy of Sciences (India), Allahabad
 Fellow of Indian Academy of Sciences, Bangalore
 Fellow of Entomology Society of India, New Delhi
 Fellow of National Environmental Science Academy, New Delhi
 Fellow of Indian Society for Parasitology
 Fellow of Indian Society of Malaria and other communicable diseases
 Honorary Fellow – Indian Academy of Environmental Sciences, Moradabad, Uttar Pradesh
 Honorary Fellow – Indian Academy of Environmental Sciences, Hardwar
 Fellow – Zoological Society of India
 President of National Academy of Vector borne Diseases
 President of National Academy of Sciences (India), Allahabad
 President of Indian Society for Parasitology
 Council Member – International Congress of Entomology
 board member – Malaria Foundation Incorporated
 Governing Council Member – ICMR
 Member – WHO Expert Committee on Malaria

Awards and recognitions

 Padma Bhushan – 2014
 Gujar Mal Modi Award – 2013
 Meghnad Saha Distinguished Fellowship
 Padma Shri – 1992
 WHO Darling Foundation Prize – 1999
 GI Inventions Award
 Chancellor's Prize
 M. O. T. Aiyengar Award
 B. R. Ambedkar Centenary Award – 2000
 Om Prakash Bhasin Award – 1985
 Ranbaxy Award – 1990
 M. L. Gupta Trust Award
 FICCI Cash Award – 1998
 Vaswik Award
 Green Scientist Award – 2001
 Best Scientist Award
 G. P. Chatterjee Memorial Award
 Dr. R. V. Rajaram Oration Award
 Dr. U. S. Srivastava Memorial Lecture Award
 Professor L. S. Ramaswami Memorial Oration Award
 Life Time Achievement Award by the Indian Society of Malaria and other communicable diseases
 B. N. Singh Oration Award
 B. K. Srivastava Oration Award
 Distinguished Parasitologist – World Parasitologist Federation (WPF) – 2010
 Gold Medal lifetime Achievement Award – Indian Academy of Environmental Sciences – 2012

Works
Sharma was the Chief Editor of an important journal, the Journal of Parasitic Diseases, which was active in dissemination of knowledge by publishing reviews and research papers on a regular basis. He was also the Chief Editor of the in-house journal of the National Academy of Sciences, India.

He has also published many books on the subjects of bioenvironmental control and vector biology, both in English and Hindi languages.

Books in English
 
 
 
 
 
Books in Hindi
 
 
Apart from the books, Sharma has written over 300 research papers in various national and international journals.

External links
 Reference on Nirdeshak
 GM Modi Science Foundation Award report
 Lecture at Jawaharlal Nehru University

References

1938 births
2015 deaths
Recipients of the Padma Bhushan in science & engineering
People from Allahabad district
Malariologists
20th-century Indian biologists
Indian medical writers
Recipients of the Padma Shri in science & engineering
Fellows of the Indian Academy of Sciences
Fellows of the National Academy of Medical Sciences
Scientists from Uttar Pradesh
Indian parasitologists
Indian medical researchers
The Darling Foundation Prize laureates